Anton M. Cerer (October 30, 1916 – May 25, 2006) was the first Slovenian or Yugoslavian swimmer to win a European medal. His career was interrupted by World War II, yet he competed at the Summer Olympics in 1936 and 1948 and European championships in 1938, 1947 and 1950. He won two European medals and finished fifth at the 1948 Olympics in the 200 m breaststroke event.

He was born in Slovenia, formerly part of Yugoslavia, but in the 1950s emigrated to the United States. Between 1983 and 2002 he competed in the masters category and dominated world championships in his age group (above 80) in breaststroke, butterfly and medley disciplines. He died after slipping in a pool in Cleveland, Ohio, aged 90, while training for the FINA World Masters Championships.

References

1916 births
2006 deaths
Slovenian male swimmers
Male breaststroke swimmers
Swimmers at the 1936 Summer Olympics
Swimmers at the 1948 Summer Olympics
Olympic swimmers of Yugoslavia
Yugoslav emigrants to the United States
Slovenian emigrants to the United States
Yugoslav male swimmers
European Aquatics Championships medalists in swimming
People from Kamnik
Accidental deaths in Ohio
Accidental deaths from falls